Camarillo is a city in Ventura County in the U.S. state of California. As of the 2020 United States Census, the population was 70,741, an increase of 5,540 from the 65,201 counted in the 2010 Census. Camarillo is named for brothers Juan and Adolfo Camarillo, prominent Californios who owned Rancho Calleguas and founded the city. California State University, Channel Islands is housed on the former grounds of the Camarillo State Hospital.

History
At the time of European contact in the 18th century, Camarillo had been inhabited by the Chumash Indians for thousands of years.

Present day Camarillo and the larger Oxnard Plain were portions of a paramount Chumash capital at the village of Muwu (today's Point Mugu). Simo'mo (CA-VEN-24), which translates to "the saltbush patch", was a Chumash village located upstream from Mugu Lagoon near the city of Camarillo. Caves with ancient pictographs are located in the area around Conejo Grade including a site used for religious ceremonies dating back to 500 A.D., where two Chumash villages were located: Lalimanux (Lalimanuc or Lalimanuh) and Kayɨwɨš or Kayiwish (Kawyis) (CA-VEN-243). The village of Kayɨwɨš (Chumash: "The Head") was first encountered by Europeans of the first Portola expedition on August 16, 1795.

19th century

By the early 1820s, Mexico had gained independence from Spain, and shortly afterward California allied itself with Mexico. The Mexican land grant system was liberalized in 1824, resulting in many large grants in California and the proliferation of Ranchos north of the border. One grant to José Pedro Ruiz created Rancho Calleguas in 1837, in the area that is now Camarillo. The grant was later sold to Juan Camarillo, who had arrived in 1834 as a member of the Híjar-Padrés colony; it was his sons Adolfo and Juan that are credited with the founding of the town that was to bear their name.

Early 20th century 
Around 1910, the area for the original town site of Camarillo was beginning to be laid out. The town was centered around St. Mary Magdalen Church, which was to serve as the family chapel for Adolfo Camarillo. In 1927 Don Juan Camarillo, brother of Adolfo, donated  to be used as a seminary to be named in honor of Saint John the Evangelist. The Roman Catholic seminary was opened in 1939 as St. John's Seminary.

Camarillo's growth was slow from founding through World War II. In the late 1940s, building lots on Ventura Boulevard, the main downtown street, were being offered for $450 and home lots on the adjoining streets were $250, with few buyers. Travel to and from Los Angeles was difficult, owing to the narrow, tortuous road climbing the Conejo Grade to the east of the city.

The main industry during this period was agriculture, and the area surrounding the small town was blanketed with orange, lemon and walnut groves. The State Mental hospital, that was built south of the town, was the largest employer. A few houses had sprung up to the north and south of town center. The Oxnard Army Air Field, built during World War II to the west of town, the Naval Air Facility at Point Mugu and the Seabee base at Port Hueneme brought many military personnel to the area, but there was little private industry or other source of non-agricultural employment.

Oxnard AAF closed at the end of World War II, but the Navy facilities remained open, with the airfield upgraded to Naval Air Station Point Mugu and the Seabee base becoming Naval Construction Battalion Center Port Hueneme and Naval Surface Warfare Center Port Hueneme. With the Korean War and associated Cold War tensions, the former Oxnard AAF was reactivated in 1951 as Oxnard Air Force Base, an Air Defense Command / Aerospace Defense Command fighter-interceptor base, that closed again in 1970 and became the present-day Camarillo Airport.

In the mid-1950s, the Ventura Freeway was completed from Los Angeles to points north, making it an easy one-hour trip to Camarillo. The Old Town was bisect by the Ventura Freeway. On the southern side of the freeway contains a strip of businesses, churches, schools, and parks. The freeway was originally planned to follow the path of Potrero Road, south of Camarillo, which would have completely by-passed the soon-to-be city. However, after much debate, city officials persuaded Caltrans to lay the freeway parallel to Ventura Boulevard, creating the infamously steep descent from the Santa Monica Mountains, known as the Conejo Grade. There is a California Highway Patrol brake inspection station at the top of the grade and a stop is mandatory for all 18-wheel trucks. The completion of the freeway facilitated the growth that followed. In 1962, the population was 7,500 and 3M began construction for the Mincom and Magnetic Tape Divisions, which would ultimately employ 900 people, becoming the largest local employer. That plant briefly housed a factory for 3M spinoff Imation before being closed in 2008.

Incorporation

Plans were made for the incorporation of the city to control the rapid expansion. Camarillo became a city in 1964 and soon put into place a General Plan and building codes.

Many of the home buyers during the 1960s were military veterans, who had been stationed at one of the local bases. The temperate climate and the living conditions lured them back. With the establishment of both the Pacific Missile Range at NAS Point Mugu and the Naval Civil Engineering Laboratory at Port Hueneme many found employment that utilized their military training. Other newcomers were those who worked and lived in the San Fernando Valley and were willing to endure the commute for the opportunity to raise their families in a smog-free, semirural environment. Still others relocated here with their employers, like 3M, and Harbor Freight Tools who built facilities in and around the city to take advantage of the large workforce. Technicolor Video Services Inc. was the largest DVD duplicator in the world.

In 2014, the council voted against an  that would have extended development on agricultural lands east towards the Conejo Grade.

Camarillo Springs Fire

Beginning 7:02 am. on Thursday, May 2, 2013, a major brush fire began in the Camarillo Springs area and burned throughout the area. The community of Dos Vientos and CSUCI were evacuated due to the proximity of the fire. About 15 houses were damaged, but none burned down. 28,000 acres of land was burned by the fire. Finally, on Sunday, May 5, 2013, rain in the area during the night helped firefighters bring the fire under full control.

Geography

Camarillo is located in Pleasant Valley at the eastern end of the Oxnard Plain, with the Santa Susana Mountains to the north, the Camarillo Hills to the northwest, the Conejo Valley to the east, and the western reaches of the Santa Monica Mountains to the south.

Climate
This region experiences warm (but not hot) and dry summers, with no average monthly temperatures above . According to the Köppen Climate Classification system, Camarillo has a warm-summer Mediterranean climate, abbreviated "Csb" on climate maps.

Demographics

2010

The 2010 United States Census reported that Camarillo had a population of 65,201. The racial makeup of Camarillo was 48,947 (75.1%) White, 1,216 (1.9%) African American, 397 (0.6%) Native American, 6,633 (10.2%) Asian, 116 (0.2%) Pacific Islander, 4,774 (7.3%) from other races, and 3,118 (4.8%) from two or more races. Hispanic or Latino of any race were 14,958 persons (22.9%).

The Census reported that 64,705 people (99.2% of the population) lived in households, 155 (0.2%) lived in non-institutionalized group quarters, and 341 (0.5%) were institutionalized.

There were 24,504 households, out of which 8,103 (33.1%) had children under the age of 18 living in them, 13,565 (55.4%) were traditional married couples living together, 2,386 (9.7%) had a female householder with no husband present, 1,078 (4.4%) had a male householder with no wife present. There were 1,257 (5.1%) non-traditional couples or partnerships. 5,986 households (24.4%) were made up of individuals, and 3,231 (13.2%) had someone living alone who was 65 years of age or older. The average household size was 2.64. There were 17,029 families (69.5% of all households); the average family size was 3.14.

The population was spread out, with 15,115 people (23.2%) under the age of 18, 5,164 people (7.9%) aged 18 to 24, 15,895 people (24.4%) aged 25 to 44, 17,825 people (27.3%) aged 45 to 64, and 11,202 people (17.2%) who were 65 years of age or older. The median age was 40.8 years. For every 100 females, there were 93.7 males. For every 100 females age 18 and over, there were 90.7 males.

The homeowner vacancy rate was 1.4%; the rental vacancy rate was 5.2%. 45,522 people (69.8% of the population) lived in owner-occupied housing units and 19,183 people (29.4%) lived in rental housing units.

2000

As of the census of 2000, there were 57,084 people, 24,376 households, and 15,242 families residing in the city. The population density was 3,015.3 inhabitants per square mile (1,164.2/km2). The racial makeup of the city was 70.90% White, 1.90% African American, 0.52% Native American, 9.40% Asian, 0.60% Pacific Islander, 13.20% from other races, and 3.90% from two or more races. Hispanic or Latino of any race were 23.10% of the population.

There were 24,376 households, out of which 33.0% had children under the age of 18 living with them, 59.7% were married couples living together, 8.2% had a female householder with no husband present, and 28.9% were non-families. 24.1% of all households were made up of individuals, and 13.6% had someone living alone who was 65 years of age or older. The average household size was 2.62 and the average family size was 3.12.

In the city, the population was spread out, with 25.3% under the age of 18, 6.5% from 18 to 24, 28.5% from 25 to 44, 22.7% from 45 to 64, and 17.0% who were 65 years of age or older. The median age was 39 years. For every 100 females, there were 93.9 males. For every 100 females age 18 and over, there were 90.2 males.

The median income for a household in the city was $62,457, and the median income for a family was $72,676 (these figures had risen to $78,677 and $92,683 respectively as of a 2007 estimate). Males had a median income of $51,507 versus $36,240 for females. The per capita income for the city was $28,635. About 3.6% of families and 5.3% of the population were below the poverty line, including 5.9% of those under age 18 and 4.6% of those age 65 or older.

Economy

Semtech, Salem Communications, and Surfware are based in Camarillo.

Top civilian employers
According to the city's 2020 Comprehensive Annual Financial Report, the ten largest employers are:

Education

The primary public high schools serving Camarillo are Adolfo Camarillo High School in Mission Oaks, Rio Mesa High School in Strickland between Oxnard and Camarillo, and Rancho Campana High School near the intersection of Lewis Road and Las Posas Road. All three high schools are part of the Oxnard Union High School District.

California State University, Channel Islands

Camarillo State Mental Hospital was established near the city in the 1930s so that persons suffering from mental illnesses or tuberculosis could recover in Ventura County's balmy climate. Jazzman Charlie Parker's "Relaxin' at Camarillo," written while he was detoxing from heroin addiction, is a tribute to the facility. The song "Camarillo" by punk outfit Fear is also written about the facility. The band Ambrosia released a song called "Ready for Camarillo" on their 1978 Life Beyond L.A. album. "Ready for Camarillo" also appeared as the single B side of their hit "How Much I Feel." The former hospital is the now the site of California State University, Channel Islands. The university has retained the distinctive Mission Revival-style bell tower in the South quad.

The Camarillo State Hospital was closed in the 1990s and remained vacant until the site was converted into California State University, Channel Islands (CSUCI). CSUCI officially opened in August 2002 and is now accredited by the WASC.

Parks and recreation

The Pleasant Valley Recreation and Park District operates recreational facilities in Ventura County, including Camarillo.

Parks

 Adolfo Park
 Arneill Ranch Park
 Birchview Park
 Bob Kildee Community Park
 Calleguas Creek
 Camarillo Grove Park
 Carmenita Park
 Charter Oak Park
 Community Center Park 
 Dos Caminos Park
 Encanto Park
 Foothill Park
 Freedom Park
 Heritage Park
 Laurelwood Park
 Eldred Lokker Memorial Park
 Mission Oaks Park 
 Nancy Bush Park
 Pitts Ranch Park
 Pleasant Valley Fields 
 Quito Park
 Springville Park  
 Trailside Park
 Valle Lindo Park
 Woodcreek Park
 Woodside Park

Facilities

 Aquatic Center 
 Auditorium
 Classrooms
 Community Center
 Dirt BMX Track
 Equestrian Center
 Freedom Center
 Freedom Gym
 Roller Hockey Rink
 R/C Track
 Senior Center
 Skatepark

Camarillo Christmas Parade
The Pleasant Valley Recreation and Park District has hosted the Camarillo Christmas Parade since 1962. The Christmas Parade usually occurs during the first or second weekend in December. Hundreds of organizations and thousands of people participate in the parade. Community Members come from all over to watch the parade. Notable Grand Marshals have included Jessica Mendoza, Lisa Guerrero, Jack Wilson, Fernando Vargas, and Walter Brennan.

Government

At the city's incorporation in 1964, a council-manager form of government was created. The five member city council is elected at large for four-year terms. The council is responsible for establishing policy, enacting laws and making legal and financial decisions for the city. A city manager, hired by the council and answerable to it, is responsible for the day-to-day operation of the city. That person is charged with overall management of the five city departments. Services such as water, sewer, trash collection, street maintenance and traffic engineering are provided by a combination of contractors and city employees.

Police services are provided by the Ventura County Sheriff's Department under contract to the city, headquartered in a police station owned by the city. The contract providing police services has been in place since the incorporation of Camarillo in 1964.  The Sheriff's department helicopter fleet is hangared at Camarillo Airport. Ventura County Fire Department provides fire protection, with five stations within the city limits.

In 2000, Camarillo was a stronghold for the Republican Party, and had nearly twice as many Republican voters as Democratic voters. By 2020, voter registration for both parties was close to even.

Library
On October 13, 2010, the Camarillo City Council voted 5–0 to withdraw from the Ventura County Library System, and enter into a public-private contract with Library Systems & Services (LSSI) of Germantown, Maryland, a private company that administers several libraries throughout the United States, to provide locally hired staffing and to manage the day-to-day operations of the City of Camarillo Public Library. Under the partnership agreement, the library will remain in the public trust, managed by the City of Camarillo and operated by LSSI.

On January 1, 2011, the City of Camarillo Public Library opened as a municipal public library.

Infrastructure

Transportation

VCTC Intercity operates buses between Camarillo and several nearby cities, including the Conejo Express to the Warner Center area in western Los Angeles County.

The City of Camarillo operates a trolley within central Camarillo, which runs from 10:00 to 6:00 Sunday through Thursday and later into the evening on Friday and Saturday nights. CAT operates one scheduled bus line Monday through Friday within Camarillo, and Dial-A-Ride services for the disabled Monday through Saturday.

Camarillo Airport

The airport has one runway and serves privately operated general aviation and executive aircraft, with no scheduled commercial service.

Camarillo Station

Camarillo has one train station, served by both Amtrak's Pacific Surfliner from San Luis Obispo to San Diego and Metrolink's Ventura County Line from Los Angeles Union Station to Montalvo. Nine Pacific Surfliner trains serve the station daily and six Metrolink trains serve the station each weekday. This limited Metrolink service runs only at peak hours in the peak direction of travel (i.e. three morning departures to Los Angeles and three evening arrivals from Los Angeles).

Water

Notable people
 August Ames, adult film actress 
 Bryan Anger, NFL punter
 Bill Austin, football player of the 1950s
Bob and Mike Bryan, brothers and professional tennis players, 16 major championships, Olympic gold medalists 
Brandon Cruz, actor and musician
Kaley Cuoco, actress, star of television's The Big Bang Theory
Jeremy Fischer, high jumper and coach
Scott Fujita, linebacker for Cleveland Browns
Nat Gertler, writer, comics creator (About Comics)
Ashley Johnson, actress
Bobby Kimball, wide receiver for Green Bay Packers 1979-80
Charlie Kimball, Indycar driver
Henry Koster, Academy Award-nominated film director
John D. Lowry, film restoration specialist
Jessica Mendoza, USA softball player and ESPN baseball broadcaster
Mad Mike, musician
Peggy Moran, actress in films from 1938 to 1943
Cyrus Nowrasteh, screenwriter, producer and director
Mike Parrott, MLB pitcher for Baltimore Orioles and Seattle Mariners 1977-81
Duncan Renaldo, Western actor best remembered for playing The Cisco Kid.
Marla Runyan, Paralympic gold medalist, one of only five athletes to participate in both Paralympics and Olympics
Robert A. Rushworth, USAF astronaut
Jimmie Sherfy, Major League Baseball pitcher
Emil Sitka, actor of many films and television shows, most notably The Three Stooges film shorts
Jordan Sweeney, musician 
Jeff Tackett, Major League Baseball catcher 1991-94
Jason Wade, guitarist and vocalist of rock band Lifehouse 
Trevor Wallace, comedian, actor, podcaster
Patrick Warburton, actor, known for TV series Seinfeld
Delmon Young, Major League Baseball outfielder 2006-15

See also 
Adolfo Camarillo
Camarillo Ranch House
Western Foundation of Vertebrate Zoology

References

External links

 

 
Cities in Ventura County, California
Incorporated cities and towns in California
1898 establishments in California
Populated places established in 1898